Rajanpur is a city in Punjab, Pakistan.

Rajanpur may also refer to:
Rajanpur District, a district of Punjab (Pakistan).
Rajanpur Tehsil, a tehsil of district Rajanpur.
Rajanpur railway station, a railway station in Pakistan.

See also
 
 Rajapur (disambiguation)